The Mexico women's national basketball team, is controlled by the Asociación Deportiva Mexicana de Baloncesto ADEMEBA Mexican Basketball Association and represents Mexico in international competitions.

Honours

Pan American Games
Silver Medal  1975 2011

Centrobasket
Gold Medal  1973 1977

Silver Medal  1971 1975 1981 1985 1993 2001 2006

Bronze Medal  1989 1999 2010

FIBA COCABA Championship
Gold Medal  2009 2013 2015

Bronze Medal  2004

Tournament record

FIBA World Championship
 1953: 8th place
 1957: 8th place
 1975: 6th place

FIBA Americas Championship
 1989: 7th place
 1993: 5th place
 1999: 4th place
 2001: 6th place
 2003: 4th place
 2007: 7th place
 2011: 6th place
 2013: 10th place
 2017: 10th place
 2019: 9th place

Head coach position
 Elsa Hayashi – 2014

See also
Mexico women's national under-19 basketball team
Mexico women's national under-17 basketball team
Mexico women's national 3x3 team

References

External links
Official website
FIBA Profile
Latinbasket – Mexico Women National Team
Archived records of Mexico team participations

 
Women's national basketball teams